Pseudohemiodon laminus is a species of armored catfish endemic to Peru where it is found in the upper Amazon basin.  This species grows to a length of  SL.

References
 

Loricariini
Fish of South America
Freshwater fish of Peru
Taxa named by Albert Günther
Fish described in 1868